The Wolf Men (also known as Wolves and the Wolf Men) is a 1969 documentary film produced by Irwin Rosten. It was produced for the GE Monogram documentary series on NBC. It was nominated for an Academy Award for Best Documentary Feature.

See also
 List of American films of 1969

References

External links

1969 films
1969 documentary films
American documentary films
Metro-Goldwyn-Mayer films
1960s English-language films
1960s American films